Hammerich is a surname. Notable people with the surname include:

Borghild Hammerich (1901–1978) Norwegian activist
 Bodil Hammerich (1877–1941), Danish American actress
Carl Hammerich (1888–1945) Danish naval officer and admiral
Else Hammerich (born 1936) Danish politician
Golla Hammerich (1854–1903), Danish pianist
Holger Hammerich (1845–1915), Danish engineer and politician
Martin Hammerich (1811–1881) Danish art historian, educator, author and translator
Paul Hammerich (1927–1992) Danish journalist and writer
Rumle Hammerich (born 1954) Danish film director, screenwriter and film company director

Surnames